Austrian Journal of Earth Sciences is a peer-reviewed open access scholarly journal publishing original scientific contributions covering a wide spectrum of earth science topics, mainly focusing on Alpine geology and the geology of Central Europe and Alpine orogens. It the official journal of the Austrian Geological Society (Österreichische Geologische Gesellschaft). The current editor-in-chief is Michael Wagreich.

Abstracting and indexing 
The journal is abstracted and indexed in:

References

External links 
 

Open access journals
Publications established in 1908
English-language journals
Geology journals
De Gruyter academic journals